Gazzari is an Italian surname. Notable people with the surname include:

Lorenzo Gazzari (1907–1998), Italian footballer
Otmar Gazzari (1905–1987), Italian footballer
Pablo Gazzarri, Argentine priest presumed murdered in the Dirty War

Italian-language surnames